In particle physics, flavor-changing neutral currents or flavour-changing neutral currents (FCNCs) are hypothetical interactions that change the flavor of a fermion without altering its electric charge.

Details
If they occur in nature (as reflected by Lagrangian interaction terms), these processes may induce phenomena that have not yet been observed in experiment. Flavor-changing neutral currents may occur in the Standard Model beyond the tree level, but they are highly suppressed by the GIM mechanism. Several collaborations have searched for FCNC.  The Tevatron CDF experiment observed evidence of FCNC in the decay of the strange B-meson to phi mesons in 2005.

FCNCs are generically predicted by theories that attempt to go beyond the Standard Model, such as the models of supersymmetry or technicolor. Their suppression is necessary for an agreement with observations, making FCNCs important constraints on model-building.

Example
Consider a toy model in which an undiscovered boson S may couple both to the electron as well as the tau via the term

Since the electron and the tau have equal charges, the electric charge of S clearly must vanish to respect the conservation of electric charge. A Feynman diagram with S as the intermediate particle is able to convert a tau into an electron (plus some neutral decay products of the S).

The MEG experiment at the Paul Scherrer Institute near Zurich will search for a similar process, in which an antimuon decays to a photon and an antielectron (a positron). In the Standard Model, such a process proceeds only by emission and re-absorption of a charged , which changes the  into a neutrino on emission and then a positron on re-absorption, and finally emits a photon that carries away any difference in energy, spin, and momentum.

In most cases of interest, the boson involved is not a new boson S but the conventional  boson itself. This can occur if the coupling to weak neutral currents is (slightly) non-universal. The dominant universal coupling to the Z boson does not change flavor, but sub-dominant non-universal contributions can.

FCNCs involving the  boson for the down-type quarks at zero momentum transfer are usually parameterized by the effective action term

This particular example of FCNC is often studied the most because we have some fairly strong constraints coming from the decay of  mesons in Belle and BaBar. The off-diagonal entries of U parameterizes the FCNCs and current constraints restrict them to be less than one part in a thousand for |Ubs|. The contribution coming from the one-loop Standard Model corrections are actually dominant, but the experiments are precise enough to measure slight deviations from the Standard Model prediction.

Experiments tend to focus on flavor-changing neutral currents as opposed to charged currents, because the weak neutral current ( boson) does not change flavor in the Standard Model proper at the tree level whereas the weak charged currents ( bosons) do. New physics in charged current events would be swamped by more numerous  boson interactions; new physics in the neutral current would not be masked by a large effect due to ordinary Standard Model physics.

See also
Two-Higgs-doublet model

References

Standard Model
Physics beyond the Standard Model
Hypothetical processes